Henry Alvah Strong (August 30, 1838 – July 26, 1919) was an American photography businessman. He was the first president of the Eastman Kodak Company.

Early life and family
Henry Strong was born on August 30, 1838, in Rochester, New York. He graduated from Wyoming Academy in 1858. On August 30, 1859, he married Helen Phoebe Griffin. They had three children: Gertrude Achilles, Helen Carter, and Henry G. Strong. After Helen's death in 1904 from diabetes, he married Hattie (Corrin) Lockwood on June 14, 1905. He adopted her son, Corrin, and the family returned to Rochester, New York.

Business ventures

Strong held a lead position in his family's buggy whip manufacturing company prior to meeting George Eastman in 1870.  In 1881 he helped provide capital to Eastman to launch the Eastman Dry Plate Company which would later become Eastman Kodak Company.

Legacy
Numerous buildings in Rochester, notably Strong Memorial Hospital and Strong Auditorium at the University of Rochester were built from his philanthropy.

References

1838 births
1919 deaths
American manufacturing businesspeople
Kodak people
19th-century American businesspeople